Archibald Hardie (14 April 1892 – 31 March 1976) was an Australian cricketer. He played two first-class matches for Western Australia in 1922/23.

See also
 List of Western Australia first-class cricketers

References

External links
 

1892 births
1976 deaths
Australian cricketers
Western Australia cricketers